7th BSFC Awards
January 11, 1987

Best Film: 
 Blue Velvet 
The 7th Boston Society of Film Critics Awards honored the best filmmaking of 1986. The awards were given on 11 January 1987.

Winners
Best Film:
Blue Velvet
Best Actor:
Bob Hoskins – Mona Lisa
Best Actress:
Chloe Webb – Sid and Nancy
Best Supporting Actor (tie):
Dennis Hopper – Blue Velvet
Ray Liotta – Something Wild
Best Supporting Actress:
Dianne Wiest – Hannah and Her Sisters
Best Director (tie):
David Lynch – Blue Velvet
Oliver Stone – Platoon
Best Screenplay:
Woody Allen – Hannah and Her Sisters
Best Cinematography:
Frederick Elmes – Blue Velvet
Best Documentary:
Mother Teresa 
Best Foreign-Language Film:
Betty Blue (37°2 le matin) • France

References

External links
Past Winners
1986 Boston Society of Film Critics Awards Internet Movie Database

1986
1986 film awards
1986 awards in the United States
1986 in Boston
January 1987 events in the United States